Broom Hill may refer to:

Broom Hill, Bristol, England
Broom Hill, County Durham, England
Broom Hill, Hadleigh, Suffolk, England
Broom Hill, an area of Ingleby Barwick, North Yorkshire, England
Broom Hill, London, a district in Bromley
Broom Hill, Greater Victoria, near Sooke, on the southern tip of Vancouver Island, British Columbia,  Canada
Broom Hill, Indiana, USA
a place in Western Australia, now called Broomehill

See also
 Broomhill (disambiguation)
 Broomhall (disambiguation)

External links